David Zuberbühler (born 20 February 1979) is a Swiss businessman and politician. He currently serves as a member of the National Council (Switzerland) for the Swiss People's Party since 2015. He previously served on the Cantonal Council of Appenzell Ausserrhoden from 2011 to 2016.

Early life and education 
Zuberbühler was born 20 February 1979 in Herisau, Switzerland, where he also grew-up and attended the local schools.

Career 
He was born into an entrepreneurial family which owns two shoe store businesses, including Hälg Markenschuhe AG (Hälg Brand Shoes) and zubischuhe.ch AG, in the third generation. He is currently in the management of both companies.

Politics 
In 1999, Zuberbühler was among the founders of the Young Swiss People's Party in Appenzell Ausserrhoden. In the same year he joined the municipal party alliance and was subsequently elected into municipal council of Herisau, as the youngest member aged 19/20. He served there until 2011 and presided over the Finance commission. Between 2011 and 2016, he served as a member of the Cantonal Council of Appenzell Ausserrhoden.

In the 2015 Swiss federal election, Zuberbühler was ultimately elected to National Council (Switzerland) for the Swiss People's Party. He is a member on the security commission as well as the delegation for the relations to the Landtag of Liechtenstein. He is also a member of the parliamentary group Independent Weapon Rights.

Personal life 
Zuberbühler is married to Yasmine (née Preisig) and they have two children; Marc (b. 2005) and Nico (b. 2007).

References 

21st-century Swiss politicians
Swiss People's Party politicians
Swiss businesspeople
1979 births
Living people